Singulisphaera rosea is a moderately acidophilic, mesophilic, aerobic and non-motile bacterium from the genus of Singulisphaera which has been isolated from Sphagnum peat from the Tver Region in Russia.

References

Bacteria described in 2012